Ricky Turner (born May 14, 1962) is a former American football and Canadian football quarterback in the National Football League (NFL) and Canadian Football League (CFL). He played in the CFL for the Toronto Argonauts and the NFL for the Indianapolis Colts. He played college football at Washington State.

References

External links

1962 births
Living people
Players of American football from Los Angeles
American football quarterbacks
Canadian football quarterbacks
Washington State Cougars football players
Toronto Argonauts players
Indianapolis Colts players
Players of Canadian football from Los Angeles